The enzyme tryptophanase catalyzes the chemical reaction

L-tryptophan + H2O  indole + pyruvate + NH3

This enzyme belongs to the family of lyases, specifically in the "catch-all" class of carbon-carbon lyases.  The systematic name of this enzyme class is L-tryptophan indole-lyase (deaminating; pyruvate-forming). Other names in common use include L-tryptophanase, and L-tryptophan indole-lyase (deaminating).  This enzyme participates in tryptophan metabolism and nitrogen metabolism.  It has 2 cofactors: pyridoxal phosphate,  and potassium.

Structural studies

As of late 2007, 3 structures have been solved for this class of enzymes, with PDB accession codes 1AX4, 2C44, and 2OQX.

References

External links

EC 4.1.99
Pyridoxal phosphate enzymes
Potassium enzymes
Enzymes of known structure